is a Japanese former Nippon Professional Baseball infielder.

References 

1969 births
Living people
Baseball people from Kyoto Prefecture 
Japanese baseball players
Nippon Professional Baseball infielders
Fukuoka Daiei Hawks players
Yakult Swallows players
Chiba Lotte Marines players